"Lydia" is the debut single by American rock band Highly Suspect, from their debut album Mister Asylum (2015). The song first appeared on the 2013 EP Black Ocean. It hit the top 5 on the Billboard Mainstream Rock chart in August 2015.

Music video
The music video was released in June 2015. Director TS Pfeffer, conceptualized the stunt and brought it to the band in early 2015. It was shot underwater in one take and stars freediver Marina Kazankova.

As of August 2022, the video has over 52 Million views on YouTube.

Charts

Weekly charts

Year-end charts

Certifications

References

2015 debut singles
2013 songs
Highly Suspect songs
300 Entertainment singles